Gary Groth (born September 18, 1954) is an American comic book editor, publisher and critic.  He is editor-in-chief of The Comics Journal, a co-founder of Fantagraphics Books, and founder of the Harvey Awards.

Early life
Groth is the son of a U.S. Navy contractor and was raised in Springfield, Virginia, in the Washington, D.C. area. He read his first comic book in a pediatrician's office.

Career

Fanzines and pop culture conventions 
Inspired by film critics like Andrew Sarris and Pauline Kael, and gonzo journalists like Hunter S. Thompson, the teenage Groth published Fantastic Fanzine, a comics fanzine (whose name referenced the Marvel Comics title Fantastic Four). 

For three years — in 1970, 1971, and 1973 — he organized Metro Con, a comics convention held in the Washington, D.C. area.

Later, after turning down an editorial assistant position at Marvel Comics in 1973, Groth worked briefly as a production and layout assistant at the movie and comics magazine Mediascene, which was edited by Jim Steranko.

After dropping out of his fourth college in 1974, Groth and his financial partner Michael Catron put on a rock and roll convention that ended in financial failure. Nonetheless, he and Catron dabbled in music publishing with the short-lived magazine Sounds Fine.

Fantagraphics
In 1976 Groth founded Fantagraphics Books, Inc. with Catron and Kim Thompson, and took over an adzine named The Nostalgia Journal—quickly renaming it The Comics Journal. Groth's Comics Journal applied rigorous critical standards to comic books. It disparaged formulaic superhero books and work for hire publishers and favored artists like R. Crumb and Art Spiegelman and creator ownership of copyrights. It featured lengthy, freewheeling interviews with comics professionals, often conducted by Groth himself.

Controversy
Groth's first editorial in The Nostalgia Journal began a lengthy feud with Alan Light, founder, and at that time, publisher of The Buyer's Guide for Comics Fandom.

Groth and Light were friends before Light published Groth's final issue of Fantastic Fanzine; Light's expedient business methods met with Groth's disapproval.    Fandom: Confidential, Ron Frantz's history of the WE Seal of approval program (WSA), outlines Groth's confrontations with Light at conventions and via late night collect calls.  Light in turn cashed a check for a Comics Journal advertisement that he refused to print.  Groth acquired a copy of the WSA mailing list, and without authorization, used it to solicit subscriptions; Groth later apologized for what he claimed was a misunderstanding, and soon after broke ties with WSA.  In 1983 when Light sold TBG, a Groth editorial denounced Light. Light's subsequent libel suit against Groth was eventually dismissed.

Groth's 1991 Comics Journal editorial "Lies We Cherish: The Canonization of Carol Kalish", which criticized the then-recently deceased former Marvel Comics Vice President of New Product Development for "selling cretinous junk to impressionable children", caused controversy within the industry, including outrage by Kalish's friend and colleague, writer Peter David.

Bibliography
 Groth, Gary, and Robert Fiore, eds. The New Comics: Interviews from the Pages of The Comics Journal. New York : Berkley, 1988. .

Notes

References

Further reading
 Spurgeon, Tom and Jacob Covey. Comics As Art: We Told You So. Seattle, WA : Fantagraphics, 2016.

External links
 Sequential Tart: Interview with Gary Groth (2000)
 Comics Reporter: Short Interview with Gary Groth and Kim Thompson
 Comics Reporter: Short Interview With Greg Sadowski and Gary Groth (On Fantagraphics' Harvey Kurtzman TCJ library book)
 Inkstuds: One-hour podcast interview with Gary Groth and Kim Thompson
 Discussion of Groth's Fantastic Fanzine #10, as well as pdf of the entire issue
 Discussion of Groth's Fantastic Fanzine #12, as well as pdf of the entire issue

1954 births
Living people
American magazine editors
Comics critics
Fantagraphics
Inkpot Award winners
American magazine publishers (people)
People from Springfield, Virginia
Writers from Seattle
20th-century American writers
21st-century American writers
Writers from Virginia
Writers from Buenos Aires